The 2004 Cheltenham & Gloucester Trophy was an English county cricket tournament, held between 28 August 2003 and 28 August 2004. The competition was won by Gloucestershire Gladiators who beat the Worcestershire Royals by 8 wickets at Lord's. This was the final year where only red balls and white clothing was used in the competition.

Format
The eighteen first-class counties, joined by 20 Minor Counties: Bedfordshire, Berkshire, Buckinghamshire, Cambridgeshire, Cheshire, Cornwall, Cumberland, Devon, Dorset, Herefordshire, Hertfordshire, Lincolnshire, Norfolk, Northumberland, Oxfordshire, Shropshire, Staffordshire, Suffolk, Wales Minor Counties and Wiltshire. They were also joined the national teams of Denmark, Ireland, the Netherlands and Scotland. Teams who won in the first round progressed to the second round. The 18 first class counties plus Berkshire, Cambridgeshire, Staffordshire and Wiltshire joined in the second round. The winners in the second round then progressed third round. The winners in the third round progressed to the quarter-final stage. Winners from the quarter-finals then progressed to the semi-finals from which the winners then went on to the final at Lord's which was held on 28 August 2004.

Fixtures

First round

Second round

Third round

Quarter-finals

Semi-finals

Final

''This was the last 50 overs-a-side English domestic final to be played with white clothing and red balls.

References

External links 
Cricinfo tournament page

Friends Provident Trophy seasons
Cheltenham and Amp Gloucester Trophy, 2004